The Taharua River is a river of the northwestern Hawke's Bay region of New Zealand's North Island. It flows south from its origins 25 kilometres southwest of Taupo to reach the Mohaka River of which it is one of the earliest tributaries.

See also
List of rivers of New Zealand

References

Rivers of the Hawke's Bay Region
Rivers of New Zealand